Folha Egipciense is a Brazilian newspaper published in the city of São José do Egito, Pernambuco. The average weekly circulation in 2012 was 1,200 copies.

References

Weekly newspapers published in Brazil
1912 establishments in Brazil
Newspapers established in 1912
Portuguese-language newspapers